Prepared music refers to experimental music played with a prepared instrument, such as:

Prepared piano
Prepared guitar
Prepared harp